The 2008 Kerrick Sports Sedan series was the 18th running of a national series for Sports Sedans in Australia.  It began on 17 May 2008 at Mallala Motor Sport Park and ended on 30 November at Sandown Raceway after fifteen races. 

The series was won by Darren Hossack. The battle between Hossack, driving the John Gourlay owned and still under development new Audi A4 and Tony Ricciardello and his family run team with their well sorted and multiple-championship winning Alfa Romeo GTV would go down to the final race of the series, with Hossack winning the race and the title. For Hossack it was the rare achievement of winning two Australian motor racing series in the same calendar year having previously won the 2008 Australian Superkart Championship.

Eligibile automobiles
The following automobiles were eligible to compete in the series:
 Sports Sedans complying with CAMS Group 3D regulations
 Transam Cars complying with ASSC regulations for North American Transam competition
 TraNZam cars complying with TRG of New Zealand regulations

Teams and drivers
The following drivers competed in the 2008 Kerrick Sports Sedan Series.

Race calendar 
The 2008 Kerrick Sports Sedan Series was contested over five rounds in three different Australian states with each round contested over three races.

Points system 
Points were awarded 20–17–15–13–12–11–10–9–8–7–6–5–4–3–2 based on the top fifteen positions in each race with all other classified finishers awarded 1 point. There were two bonus points allocated for first position in Qualifying at each round. 

To be eligible to score points, competitors were required to register with the series manager.

Series standings

Note: First position in Qualifying at each round is shown in bold in the above table.

References

External links
 Official series website – www.sportssedans.com.au, as archived at web.archive.org on 29 August 2008
 2008 Racing Results Archive – www.natsoft.com.au, as archived at web.archive.org on 25 July 2011

National Sports Sedan Series
Sports Sedans